The Minnesota Duluth Bulldogs men's ice hockey team is an NCAA Division I college ice hockey program that represents the University of Minnesota Duluth. The Bulldogs are a member of the National Collegiate Hockey Conference (NCHC). The team plays home games at the 6,800-seat AMSOIL Arena at the Duluth Entertainment Convention Center.

The Bulldogs program has produced many NHL players such as Glenn 'Chico' Resch, Jim Johnson who is currently the assistant coach for the San Jose Sharks, Tom Kurvers, Dave Langevin, and Bob Mason. Perhaps the best known alumni of Minnesota-Duluth include Hockey Hall of Fame member Brett Hull, as well as Mark Pavelich and John Harrington, both of whom were members of the Miracle on Ice gold medal-winning 1980 U.S. Olympic Hockey Team. On April 9, 2011, the Bulldogs defeated the University of Michigan, 3–2 in overtime, to win its first NCAA Division I Championship. UMD captured its second national championship on April 7, 2018, with a 2–1 win over the University of Notre Dame, and its third championship (and second consecutive one) on April 13, 2019, with a 3–0 win over the University of Massachusetts Amherst.

History

Early history
Duluth started its ice hockey team in 1930 but shuttered the program after only two years. Once the depression and World War II had ended, the Bulldogs rekindled the team and played as a minor independent for a few seasons before joining the MIAC as a provisional member. When UMD joined the MIAC fully in 1952 it coincided with the Bulldog's dominance of the conference. In its first two eligible seasons Minnesota–Duluth won the MIAC crown, going 15–2 in league play. After Bob Boyat's one season behind the bench where the team finished 2nd in conference, Connie Pleban took over and the Bulldogs ran roughshod over the MIAC. Duluth won six consecutive MIAC titles without losing a single game in league play. UMD also began to win against some of the major programs by the early 1960 and in 1962, with Ralph Romano now at the helm, the Duluth hockey team left the MIAC and played as an independent looking to promote itself as a major program (no formal distinctions between levels of play existed at the time for ice hockey).

WCHA
After four seasons the WCHA invited Minnesota–Duluth to join as its 8th member school. The addition of the Bulldogs allowed the WCHA to hold an 8-team conference tournament which meant that UMD would participate in the first championship in program history. Predictable the Bulldogs didn't fare well the first time out but that trend held for several seasons and it wasn't until 1971 that Duluth got its first postseason victory. More concerning was that, in its first 15 seasons in the WCHA, UMD could produce only 2 winning seasons and never finished above 5th place in the conference. All of that was set to change, however, when Mike Sertich was promoted to head coach in 1982.

1980s success
Under Sertich UMD made the NCAA Tournament three straight seasons from 1983 to 1985. The Bulldogs advanced to the NCAA Division I Men's Ice Hockey Tournament for the first time in school history in 1983, but were defeated by Providence College in a two-game series by the scores of 3–7 and 2–3.

In 1983–84 UMD won its first conference regular season title and conference postseason tournament to receive the program's second bid to the NCAA tournament. UMD defeated Clarkson University in the quarterfinals and advanced to the 1984 Frozen Four in Lake Placid, New York. UMD reached the title game by defeating WCHA foe, University of North Dakota, 2–1 in overtime. The championship game featured a match-up between Minnesota–Duluth and Bowling Green (CCHA). After 60 minutes of hockey, the game remained tied, 4–4. Bowling Green's Gino Cavallini scored a goal in the fourth overtime to defeat UMD in the longest NCAA Division I ice hockey championship game in history, 97 minutes and 11 seconds of playing time.

For the third season in a row, the Bulldogs reached the NCAA tournament and for the second straight season UMD reached the Frozen Four. The team had their hopes for a national championship lost in another overtime game, this time a 6–5 semi-final loss in three overtimes to Rensselaer. The Bulldogs would rebound in the third place game to defeat Boston College, 2–1 in overtime.

Minnesota–Duluth next bid to the NCAA tournament would come in 1993. The Bulldogs faced Brown University in the first round, winning 7–3. UMD was defeated by Lake Superior State in the quarterfinals, 4–3.  Lake Superior State would go on to the Frozen Four, losing in the national title game to Maine.

Recent history
UMD's next NCAA post-season berth came after an 11-year drought in 2004. The Bulldogs won the first game in the Midwest Regional, shutting out Michigan State 5–0. The win over Michigan State set up a game against WCHA rival and the defending back-to-back national champions, Minnesota. UMD advanced to the Frozen Four by defeating Minnesota 3–1 and faced another WCHA rival, Denver, in the semi-final game. After two periods, with UMD leading, it was looking very likely that UMD would make it into the NCAA Championship game since UMD hadn't lost all season when leading after two periods, but the Bulldogs lost to the Pioneers 5–3 after a four-goal third period by Denver.

The 2008–09 season marked a historic season for the Bulldogs. The 5th-seeded Minnesota–Duluth swept through the 2009 WCHA playoffs. UMD swept Colorado College in the opening round by scores of 4–1 and 3–1. The Bulldogs advanced to the WCHA Final Five and won 2–1 against Minnesota in the opening game at the Xcel Energy Center in Saint Paul, Minnesota; In the next game, the team beat North Dakota with a 3–0 shutout victory and advanced to the WCHA championship against Denver. Playing in the third game in three days, the Bulldogs shocked the crowd when the team defeated Denver with a 4–0 shutout win. The win over DU was the program's third WCHA Playoff Championship in the school's history and marked the first time that a 4th or 5th-seeded team had won the WCHA Final Five. The historic playoff run by UMD was punctuated by winning three games against ranked teams in three consecutive nights, including back-to-back shutouts from goaltender Alex Stalock; in addition to the shutouts, the Bulldogs allowed only three goals against through the entire WCHA playoffs.

With the WCHA title, Minnesota–Duluth secured an automatic bid to the 2009 NCAA Tournament. The Bulldogs entered tournament play and amazingly forced overtime by scoring two goals in the last 40 seconds of regulation and then scored in overtime for a 5–4 overtime win over Princeton. The team advanced to the West Regional final against first-ranked Miami (Ohio). In the game the RedHawks took a 2–0 lead into the third period when the team rallied back and scored late in the game.

The 2010–11 season marked a historic year for the UMD program. On December 30, 2010, the Bulldogs moved into the new 6,800-seat AMSOIL Arena located at the Duluth Entertainment Convention Center. In 2011, the Bulldogs earned an at-large NCAA Tournament bid. They reached the Frozen Four for the fourth time in the school's history with 2–0 and 5–3 wins over Union College and Yale University, respectively. UMD was the only Minnesota team competing in the 2011 Frozen Four at the Xcel Energy Center in St. Paul, essentially making it a home series for the team. On April 7, the Bulldogs defeated Notre Dame by a score of 4–3 to secure its first trip to the championship game since the 1983–84 season. On April 9, the Bulldogs beat the Michigan Wolverines 3–2 in overtime to win their first men's ice hockey championship in school history.

In the summer of 2011, Minnesota Duluth, along with five other schools, announced the formation of a new conference, known as the National Collegiate Hockey Conference (NCHC). The conference will begin competition for the 2013–14 season with six founding members: Colorado College, University of Denver, Miami University, University of Minnesota Duluth, University of Nebraska Omaha and University of North Dakota. In the 2011–12 season, the Bulldogs would again make it to the NCAA Tournament. The team defeated Maine by a score of 5–2, but lost to Boston College 4–0 the following evening in the regional finals. Jack Connolly was awarded the 2012 Hobey Baker award on April 6, 2012, for his performance during the season.

Minnesota-Duluth returned to the NCAA Tournament during the 2014–2015 season where they defeated the University of Minnesota 4–1 in the Northeast Regional Semi-final before losing to Boston University, 3–2, in the Northeast Regional Final.

In 2016–17, the Bulldogs compiled a 28–7–7 record and advanced to their first Frozen Four since 2011, but lost to Denver 3–2 in the national championship game.

In the 2017–2018 season, the Bulldogs defeated the Notre Dame Fighting Irish 2–1 to win the national championship.

In the 2018–2019 season, the Bulldogs defeated the UMass Minutemen 3–0 to win the national championship for the second year in a row, the first back-to-back national champions since Denver repeated in 2004 and 2005 and the first team to play in three straight National Championship games (2017, 2018, and 2019) since Boston College Eagles in 2006, 2007, and 2008.

Season-by-season results

Source:

Coaches
As of April 30, 2022

Statistical Leaders
Source:

Career points leaders

Career goaltending leaders

GP = Games played; Min = Minutes played; W = Wins; L = Losses; T = Ties; GA = Goals against; SO = Shutouts; SV% = Save percentage; GAA = Goals against average

Minimum 30 games

Statistics current through the start of the 2021–22 season.

Players

Current roster
As of July 28, 2022.

Olympians
This is a list of Minnesota–Duluth alumni who have played on an Olympic team.

Awards and honors

Hockey Hall of Fame
Source:

Brett Hull (2009)

United States Hockey Hall of Fame
Source:

Connie Pleban (1990)
Dave Langevin (1993)
Keith Christiansen (2005)
Brett Hull (2008)

NCAA

Individual awards

Hobey Baker Award
Tom Kurvers, D:       1984
Bill Watson, RW:    1985
Chris Marinucci, LW:     1994
Junior Lessard, RW:    2004
Jack Connolly, C: 2012
Scott Perunovich, D: 2020

Spencer Penrose Award
Mike Sertich: 1984
Scott Sandelin: 2004

Tim Taylor Award
Scott Perunovich: 2018

Derek Hines Unsung Hero Award
Kyle Schmidt: 2011

NCAA Division I Ice Hockey Scoring Champion
Bill Watson, RW: 1985
Junior Lessard, F: 2004

Tournament Most Outstanding Player
 J. T. Brown, RW; 2011
 Karson Kuhlman, C; 2018
 Parker Mackay, RW; 2019

All-Americans
AHCA First Team All-Americans

1965–66: Bob Hill, D
1966–67: Keith Christiansen, F
1969–70: Ron Busniuk, D; Murray Keogan, F
1970–71: Walt Ledingham, F
1971–72: Walt Ledingham, F
1972–73: Pat Boutette, F
1977–78: Curt Giles, D
1978–79: Curt Giles, D; Mark Pavelich, F
1983–84: Tom Kurvers, D; Bill Watson, F
1984–85: Rick Kosti, G; Norm Maciver, D; Bill Watson, F
1985–86: Norm Maciver, D
1989–90: Chad Erickson, G
1992–93: Brett Hauer, D; Derek Plante, F
1993–94: Chris Marinucci, F
2003–04: Junior Lessard, F
2008–09: Alex Stalock, G
2010–11: Jack Connolly, F
2011–12: Jack Connolly, F
2016–17: Alex Iafallo, F
2017–18: Scott Perunovich, D
2018–19: Hunter Shepard, G
2019–20: Scott Perunovich, D

AHCA Second Team All-Americans

1983–84: Rick Kosti, G; Bob Lakso, F
1985–86: Matt Christensen, F
1987–88: Mike DeAngelis, D
2003–04: Beau Geisler, D
2009–10: Jack Connolly, F
2010–11: Mike Connolly, F
2011–12: J. T. Brown, F
2018–19: Scott Perunovich, D
2019–20: Hunter Shepard, G; Noah Cates, F; Cole Koepke, F

WCHA

Individual awards

Player of the Year
Keith Christiansen, F: 1967
Bob Mason, G: 1983
Tom Kurvers, D: 1984
Bill Watson, F: 1985
Derek Plante, F: 1993
Chris Marinucci, F: 1994
Junior Lessard, F: 2004
Jack Connolly, F: 2012

Outstanding Student-Athlete of the Year
Brett Hauer, D: 1993
Jeff Scissons, F: 2000

Coach of the Year
Mike Sertich: 1983, 1984, 1985, 1993
Scott Sandelin: 2004

Freshman of the Year
Murray Keogan, F: 1970
Rick Kosti, G: 1984
Brett Hull, F: 1985
Brant Nicklin, G: 1997

Most Valuable Player in Tournament
Alex Stalock, G: 2009

All-Conference Teams
First Team All-WCHA

1966–67: Keith Christiansen, F
1969–70: Ron Busniuk, D; Murray Keogan, F
1970–71: Walt Ledingham, F
1974–75: Gord McDonald, D
1977–78: Curt Giles, D
1978–79: Curt Giles, D; Mark Pavelich, F
1982–83: Bob Mason, G
1983–84: Tom Kurvers, D; Bill Watson, F
1984–85: Rick Kosti, G; Norm Maciver, D; Bill Watson, F
1985–86: Norm Maciver, D; Brett Hull, F
1987–88: Mike DeAngelis, D
1989–90: Chad Erickson, G
1991–92: Greg Andrusak, D
1992–93: Brett Hauer, D; Derek Plante, F
1993–94: Chris Marinucci, F
2001–02: Andy Reierson, D
2003–04: Beau Geisler, D; Junior Lessard, F
2006–07: Matt Niskanen, D; Mason Raymond, F
2008–09: Alex Stalock, G
2009–10: Jack Connolly, F
2010–11: Jack Connolly, F; Mike Connolly, F
2011–12: Jack Connolly, F; J. T. Brown, F
2016–17: Alex Iafallo, F
2017–18: Scott Perunovich, D
2018–19: Hunter Shepard, G

Second Team All-WCHA

1965–66: Bob Hill, D
1970–71: Chico Resch, G
1971–72: Walt Ledingham, F
1972–73: Pat Boutette, F
1973–74: Gord McDonald, D
1974–75: Thomas Milani, F
1975–76: Dave Langevin, D; Thomas Milani, F
1976–77: Dan Lempe, F
1979–80: Dan Lempe, F
1981–82: Gregg Moore, F
1982–83: Gregg Moore, F
1983–84: Rick Kosti, G; Norm Maciver, D; Tom Herzig, F; Bob Lakso, F; Matt Christensen, F
1984–85: Matt Christensen, F
1986–87: Guy Gosselin, D
1991–92: Derek Plante, F
1992–93: Jon Rohloff, D; Chris Marinucci, F
1994–95: Brad Federenko, F
1996–97: Rick Mrozik, F; Mike Peluso, F
2001–02: Judd Medak, F
2003–04: Isaac Reichmuth, G; Evan Schwabe, F
2004–05: Evan Schwabe, F
2008–09: Justin Fontaine, F
2009–10: Justin Fontaine, F
2010–11: Justin Fontaine, F
2011–12: Kenny Reiter, G

Third Team All-WCHA

1995–96: Teras Lendzyk, G; Mike Peluso, F
1997–98: Mike Peluso, F
2002–03: Isaac Reichmuth, G
2008–09: Josh Meyers, D
2010–11: Justin Faulk, D
2011–12: Travis Oleksuk, F

All-WCHA Rookie Team

1993–94: Brad Federenko, F
1994–95: Mike Peluso, F
1996–97: Brant Nicklin, G; Curtis Doell, D
1997–98: Ryan Coole, D
2002–03: Isaac Reichmuth, G
2005–06: Mason Raymond, F
2006–07: Alex Stalock, G
2008–09: Mike Connolly, F
2010–11: Justin Faulk, D; J. T. Brown, F
2012–13: Andrew Welinski, D; Tony Cameranesi, F

NCHC

Individual awards

NCHC Player of the Year
 Scott Perunovich; 2020

NCHC Rookie of the Year
 Scott Perunovich; 2018

NCHC Goaltender of the Year
 Hunter Shepard; 2019, 2020
 Ryan Fanti; 2022

NCHC Offensive Defenseman of the Year
 Scott Perunovich; 2018, 2019, 2020

NCHC Defensive Forward of the Year
 Dominic Toninato; 2017
 Justin Richards; 2019, 2020

NCHC Sportsmanship Award
 Cal Decowski; 2016
 Karson Kuhlman; 2018
 Kobe Roth; 2020

Frozen Faceoff MVP
 Alex Iafallo; 2017
 Hunter Sheppard; 2019
 Ryan Fanti; 2022

All-Conference Teams
First Team All-NCHC

 2016–17: Alex Iafallo, F
 2017–18: Scott Perunovich, D
 2018–19: Hunter Shepard, G; Scott Perunovich, D
 2019–20: Hunter Shepard, G; Scott Perunovich, D; Noah Cates, F; Cole Koepke, F
 2020–21: Nick Swaney, F
 2022–22: Ryan Fanti, G

Second Team All-NCHC

 2014–15: Andy Welinski, D
 2015–16: Andy Welinski, D
 2016–17: Hunter Miska, G; Neal Pionk, D
 2017–18: Hunter Shepard, G
 2018–19: Justin Richards, F
 2020–21: Noah Cates, F

NCHC All-Rookie Team

 2013–14: Alex Iafallo, F
 2014–15: Kasmir Kasisuo, G
 2016–17: Joey Anderson, F
 2017–18: Scott Perunovich, D
 2020–21: Wyatt Kaiser, D

Bulldogs in the NHL
As of July 1, 2022.

WHA
Several players also were members of WHA teams.

Source:

See also
Minnesota–Duluth Bulldogs women's ice hockey

References

External links

 
Ice hockey teams in Minnesota